Albert Loftin Johnson (December 24, 1860 – July 2, 1901) was an American business executive in the streetcar industry. A baseball enthusiast, he was a key figure in the short-lived Players' League of 1890, while owning the Cleveland franchise in that league. He also briefly owned the Cincinnati Reds of the National League.

Biography
Johnson's father, ex-Confederate States Army colonel Albert W. Johnson, moved north after the war and became a streetcar magnate, with operations in Indianapolis, Cleveland and New York City. The younger Johnson learned the business and, with the wealth gained, largely bankrolled the Players' League. He also owned the Cleveland Infants franchise in the new league. The 1890 Infants finished with a record of 55–75, seventh place in the eight-team Players' League.

Johnson purchased the Cincinnati Reds during the 1890–91 off-season, intending to move the team from the National League to the Players' League. However, in the aftermath of the league's first season, a year in which all baseball owners lost money, the new league folded. Johnson then sold the Reds to John T. Brush.

Johnson died at his home in Brooklyn in July 1901, of a heart attack. Newspaper reports of his death differed as to if he was married or not. His brother Tom was a prominent progressive politician, serving in the United States House of Representatives and as Mayor of Cleveland.

Notes

References

External links

1860 births
1901 deaths
American business executives
Cincinnati Reds owners
Burials at Green-Wood Cemetery
19th-century American businesspeople